Conasprella crabosi is a species of sea snail, a marine gastropod mollusc in the family Conidae, the cone snails, cone shells or cones.

Distribution
This marine species occurs off Bahia, Brazil.

References

 Petuch E.J. & Berschauer D.P. (2018). Ten new cone shells from Indonesia, the Marquesas Islands, Brazil, and Pacific Panama. The Festivus. 50(1): 17-35. page(s): 23, figs 4, 12E-F

crabosi
Gastropods described in 2018